t Was één April is a 1936 Dutch film directed by Douglas Sirk and Jacques van Tol. It is a lost film.

Plot
When Mister Vlasman gets promoted from baking bread to making macaroni, he and his wife want to enter high society. They could not be happier when a wealthy baron offers to introduce them into the high class. What they don't realise is that this was all an April Fools' prank. Unfortunately for the pranksters, things get out of hand when a real baron visits the Vlasmans.

Cast
Jacques Van Bylevelt	... 	Heer Vlasman
Tilly Perin-Bouwmeester	... 	Vlasmans vrouw
Jopie Koopman	... 	Vlasmans dochter
Rob Milton	... 	Vlasmans dochters verloofde
Herman Tholen... 	Baron de Hoog van Vriesland
Johan Kaart	... 	Handelaar
Cissy Van Bennekom	... 	Vlasmans secretaresse
Pau Dana	... 	Secretaresse

Background
The movie is a remake of the German film April, April! (1935), also directed by Douglas Sirk. In the German version the baron was a prince. Sirk never came to the Netherlands. All of his scenes were shot in Germany. Scenes in the Netherlands were directed by Jacques van Tol. No known copies of the film exist today.

References

External links 
 

1936 films
Dutch black-and-white films
1936 drama films
Dutch multilingual films
Dutch drama films
Lost Dutch films
1936 multilingual films
1936 lost films
Lost drama films
1930s Dutch-language films